Eumecomera is a genus of false blister beetles in the family Oedemeridae. There are at least three described species in Eumecomera.

Species
These three species belong to the genus Eumecomera:
 Eumecomera bicolor (Horn, 1870)
 Eumecomera cyanipennis (Horn, 1870)
 Eumecomera obscura (LeConte, 1854)

References

Oedemeridae
Articles created by Qbugbot